In signal analysis, beat detection is using computer software or computer hardware to detect the beat of a musical score. There are many methods available and beat detection is always a tradeoff between accuracy and speed. Beat detectors are common in music visualization software such as some media player plugins. The algorithms used may utilize simple statistical models based on sound energy or may involve sophisticated comb filter networks or other means. They may be fast enough to run in real time or may be so slow as to only be able to analyze short sections of songs.

See also 
 Pitch detection

External links 
 Beat This > Beat Detection Algorithm
 Audio Analysis using the Discrete Wavelet Transform

Signal processing